The 1941 East Texas State Lions football team represented the East Texas State Teachers College (later renamed the Texas A&M University–Commerce) as a member of the Lone Star Conference (LSC) during the 1941 college football season. In their seventh season under head coach Bob Berry, the Lions compiled a 6–2–1 record (2–2 against conference opponents) and finished third in the Lone Star Conference. The team played its home games at East Texas Stadium in Commerce, Texas.

Schedule

References

East Texas State
Texas A&M–Commerce Lions football seasons
East Texas State football